Abejones Zapotec is a Zapotec language of Oaxaca, Mexico.

References

Smith Stark, Thomas. 2007. Algunos isoglosas zapotecas. Clasificación de las lenguas indígenas de México: Memorias del III Coloquio Internacional del Lingüística Mauricio Swadesh, ed. Christina Buenrostro et al., pp. 69–134. Mexico City: UNAM y Instituto Nacional de Lenguas Indígenas.

Zapotec languages